The Cuesta fire was a wildfire that started on 16 August 2015 near U.S. Route 101 and the Cuesta Grade, in the Santa Lucia Range just north of San Luis Obispo in San Luis Obispo County, California. The fire was contained on 28 August, and had burned 2,446 acres, some within the Los Padres National Forest.

Fire
Mandatory evacuations were declared for the area of California State Route 58 south of the Railroad Track area of Santa Margarita and the area of Miller Flat. , evacuations orders were lifted. The evacuation center was at Santa Rosa Academy in Atascadero. , 1,600 firefighters were fighting the fire.

A vehicle is blamed with starting the fire, which started three additional fires nearby, all of which were extinguished.

Within 24 hours the fire had grown from 100 acres to 500 acres.

See also

References

2015 California wildfires
Wildfires in San Luis Obispo County, California
Santa Lucia Range
Los Padres National Forest